Larry Myricks (born 10 March 1956) is an American former athlete, who mainly competed in the long jump event. He is a two-time winner of the World Indoor Championships (1987, 1989) and a two-time winner of the World Cup  (1979, 1989). He also won a bronze medal at the 1988 Seoul Olympics, and bronze medals at the World Championships in 1987 and 1991.

Career
Myricks was born in Clinton, Mississippi. A durable jumper, he first broke onto the track scene in 1976. While competing for Mississippi College, he was the NCAA Champion in the long jump.  He followed that with a second place at the U. S. Olympic Trials, beating defending Olympic champion Randy Williams in the process.  At the 1976 Olympics, he broke his foot while warming up for the final and was unable to compete.  His teammates Arnie Robinson and Williams finished 1 and 2.  The three American jumpers had been easily the top three jumpers in qualifying.

In 1979 he won again the NCAA Championship, this time both indoors and outdoors. He was also the US National Champion (27–2), and World Cup Champion (8.52 m). He repeated as U.S. national champion in 1980 and in 1989.

He competed for the United States at the 1988 Summer Olympics held in Seoul, South Korea, where he won the bronze medal in the men's long jump competition.  In addition to the 1976 Olympics, Myricks won the 1980 Olympic Trials (over a young Carl Lewis), the team that did not go to the Olympics due to the 1980 Summer Olympics boycott. As consolation, he received one of 461 Congressional Gold Medals created especially for the spurned athletes. He finished second to Lewis in the 1984 Olympic Trials.  He finished fourth in the Olympics that year.

He set his personal best of 8.74 m (28' 8") in the long jump at the 1988 Olympic Trials.  That jump still ranks Myricks as the number 5 long jumper ever.  It was the trials record, for a few minutes, until surpassed by Carl Lewis. After qualifying for four straight Olympic teams, Myricks returned in 1992 as a 36-year-old to a fifth Olympic Trials, finishing in seventh place.

Myricks was the third-place jumper at the 1991 World Championships in Athletics - Men's Long Jump when Lewis and Mike Powell were fighting over the world record, what many consider the greatest long jump competition ever.

Based on a statistical comparison of 8.16 meters, Myricks had more competitions (170) over that mark than any other competitor.  Moving that comparison to 8.50 m, he ranks second (17) to Carl Lewis (39) (as of 1996; since 1996, only 9 jumpers have jumped 8.50).  Myricks' last 8.50 in 1991, at the age of 35, is tied with Lewis' mark from the 1996 Olympics as the M35 Masters World Record.

He was also a useful 200 m sprinter, with a best of 20.03 s at the US National Championships in 1983 behind his nemesis Carl Lewis, who along with Mike Powell overshadowed him for most of his career.  He ran the 200 at the 1983 World Championships in Athletics.  Myricks won the U.S. nationals in the 200 meters in 1988.

Myricks is also a graduate of Mississippi College. He was coached there by Joe Walker (now at Ole Miss). Larry Myricks was suspended (May 1990) by the TAC after a positive test for a banned stimulant before the 1990 U.S. Championships. This suspension was extended to a lifetime ban for two subsequent positive tests. He was later reinstated after having served only one year.

International competitions

References

External links
 USTAF Profile
 Profile

1956 births
Living people
American male long jumpers
Olympic bronze medalists for the United States in track and field
Athletes (track and field) at the 1987 Pan American Games
Athletes (track and field) at the 1976 Summer Olympics
Athletes (track and field) at the 1984 Summer Olympics
Athletes (track and field) at the 1988 Summer Olympics
People from Clinton, Mississippi
Track and field athletes from Mississippi
World record holders in masters athletics
World Athletics Championships medalists
World Athletics Championships athletes for the United States
Mississippi College alumni
Doping cases in athletics
Medalists at the 1988 Summer Olympics
Pan American Games medalists in athletics (track and field)
Pan American Games silver medalists for the United States
Congressional Gold Medal recipients
American masters athletes
Goodwill Games medalists in athletics
World Athletics Indoor Championships winners
Competitors at the 1986 Goodwill Games
Medalists at the 1987 Pan American Games